Ryan Sharp (born 29 April 1979 in Newtonhill, Scotland) is a race car driver and team manager.  He raced in the FIA GT Championship in 2007 with JetAlliance Racing in their lead No. 33 Aston Martin DBR9 – with ex-F1 Driver Karl Wendlinger as his teammate. Ryan was also the 2003 German Formula Renault champion. He is currently the director of Hitech Racing.

Career history
Ryan's career began in Karting. After winning a number of local and national Karting events his talent was spotted by Dutch businessman Klass Zwart.  Zwart funded Ryan's first season of car racing in Junior Formula Ford.  Ryan progressed well despite limited funding to compete, and in 2002 moved from Formula Ford to the Formula Renault Championship, a 'slicks and wings' series, as compared to Formula Ford which does not allow aerodynamic wings.

Formula Renault
Ryan's first season in Formula Renault was in the UK, with the John Village Automotive team. He finished 6th in the championship. Ironically, his consistency in finishing every race in the points dropped him to 6th due to the Formula Renault system of dropping your lowest score through the season – meaning Ryan had to drop points while those around him dropped a '0' they had scored during the season.

For 2003, Ryan moved out of the United Kingdom to race in Formula Renault in Germany with the Jenzer Motorsport team. The move paid off handsomely, and with a lot of work and input by Jenzer Motorsport, Ryan won the championship by 40 points, and performed well in the Formula Renault Masters event at Donington in October 2003 by winning the first of the 2 races, and finishing third in the second.  He was leading the second race, but a backmarker caused a red flag and on countback Ryan was classified third. Accomplished British racer Lewis Hamilton came over to Germany during the season to race with the German Formula Renault grid. Ryan won both of the races and Hamilton finished 9th and 8th respectively.

Ryan also took part in a round of the Italian Formula Renault championship at Spa, in Belgium. Running in another competitive field (considered by some to be the most competitive Renault championship in the world) at a circuit new to him in the pouring rain, Ryan went on to win race 1 by 12 seconds and was on course to win the second until he made an error and damaged his car, failing to finish that race but performing well under the wet weather conditions.

Formula Renault v6

2004 saw Ryan continue his relationship with the highly rated Jenzer Motorsport team, but moving up to the Formula Renault V6 Eurocup. The season started quite well, when he finished third and first at the first weekend (3rd in Race 1 after spinning at Turn 1 and dropping right to the back of the field), and then achieving two-second places at the following races in Valencia. In the course of one of the two races Ryan appeared to have an invincible lead of four seconds in the race with one lap to go. However, the 4-second lead was lost in the last lap allowing Rayn to finish second. Losing places during the last section of the races was common for Ryan during this season and it was thought to be related to a general lack of fitness and mounting driver nerves towards the end of the race. Ryan had a lot to focus on and learn and an amount of inexperience at this level meant his tyres were being worked too hard and he lost pace at the end of both races.  As a result, he was passed by Damien Pasini and Robbie Kerr who won these races. Nevertheless, these first 4 rounds left him with a commanding lead at the head of the championship. The season moved to Magny Cours where Ryan consolidated his championship lead. At the F1 support race at Monaco a car failure caused him a loss of valuable points in the championship. A disappointing performance due to a loss in the family at Brno followed reducing Ryan's lead as a contender. Eventually Ryan lost the championship to Swiss/French driver Giorgio Mondini by 22 points.

GP2 Series

Ryan moved up to the new GP2 Series in 2005 with David Price Racing, a team he had raced against in 2004 and who were very impressed with his performance. The season began in Imola where the cars had teething trouble with clutches. In the 2nd round at Barcelona, Ryan was on course for a 3rd-place finish when his car failed forcing him to start at the back of the grid for the second race. In this race he set the fastest lap and gained 1 point. A series of disappointing performances followed which could be attributed to the team being poorly engineered and set up. With his hopes diminished, he returned to the team he knew and trusted. Leaving the GP2 series, he returned to Jenzer Motorsport to compete in the last few rounds of the Formula Renault 3.5l championship, and almost immediately his performances improved.  This demonstrated that the David Price Racing car used in the GP2 series was not a competitive car, and that Jenzer Motorsprt was a top team. Ryan was replaced at DPR by 2004 FRenault v6 Champion Giorgio Mondini, who also struggled to get anything out of the car.

World Touring Car Championship (WTCC)

Ryan's career took a new direction in 2006 – signing for the Italian JAS Motorsport team to contest the World Touring Car Championship, running as an Independent in the Yokohama Independent Trophy. He impressed many people in this season, becoming the first Independent driver to score an overall podium position in the season, finishing 3rd overall in Race 1 at Puebla, Mexico. Ryan won a number of races during the season (class victories), the most memorable being one of the races at Brands Hatch, UK – where he won in the pouring rain, underlining his wet weather driving skills. He was on course to finish 2nd in the championship behind Dutchman Tom Coronel, but had to miss the last 3 rounds of the Championship due to budget issues (the last round had double points, so it was effectively 4 rounds/a maximum of 80 points missed out on). At the end of the year he won the European Touring Car Cup in a SEAT Leon for GR Asia.

FIA GT Championship

Ryan moved again in 2007, to the FIA GT Championship with Austrian team JetAlliance Racing, who were only in their 2nd season of competition. The season began in Zhuhai in China, where the car finished 9th – this was followed by two 4th-place finishes at Silverstone and Bucharest. The improvement in form continued to the next race in Monza where the duo won a dramatic race. Oschersleben held no such luck as the car was hit at the start of the race, dropping him to the back, where he eventually retired. The last race they took part in was the Total 24 Hours of Spa, in which his car qualified 2nd on the grid and ran very well.  He was leading at the 6-hour mark, and so was awarded half points for a race win which amounted to 5 points. However, the car retired around 40 minutes after this and the duo lost more points in the championship race. A strong finish to the season, including 2 further wins in Adria, in the night race, and by teammate Zolder in the 10th and final round.  This resulted in Ryan and teammate Wendlinger shoot up the standings to finish 2nd in the championship, 4 points behind eventual champion, Tomas Biagi.

Later career
After finishing car racing, Ryan returned to local kart racing in Britain, winning several Scottish and British championships during this time. He retired fully at the end of 2017 to focus on his 7-year-old son Aston, who has started karting professionally.

Racing record

Complete GP2 series results
(key) (Races in bold indicate pole position) (Races in italics indicate fastest lap)

Complete Formula Renault 3.5 Series results 
(key) (Races in bold indicate pole position) (Races in italics indicate fastest lap)

† Driver did not finish the race, but was classified as he completed more than 90% of the race distance.

Complete World Touring Car Championship results
(key) (Races in bold indicate pole position) (Races in italics indicate fastest lap)

See also
 2007 FIA GT Championship season
 JetAlliance Racing
 Karl Wendlinger

References

External links
 
 Ryan Sharp's FIA GT Profile

1979 births
Living people
Scottish racing drivers
Formula Ford drivers
German Formula Renault 2.0 drivers
Italian Formula Renault 2.0 drivers
British Formula Renault 2.0 drivers
Formula Renault Eurocup drivers
Formula Renault V6 Eurocup drivers
GP2 Series drivers
FIA GT Championship drivers
European Le Mans Series drivers
World Series Formula V8 3.5 drivers
24 Hours of Spa drivers
European Touring Car Cup drivers
World Touring Car Championship drivers
David Price Racing drivers
Jenzer Motorsport drivers
Fortec Motorsport drivers